DHN may refer to:

DHN, the IATA and FAA LID code for Dothan Regional Airport, Alabama, United States
DHN, the Indian Railways station code for Dhanbad Junction railway station, Jharkhand, India
DHN, the National Rail station code for Deighton railway station, West Yorkshire, England